Mi Tianhe (born January 5, 1983) is a Chinese football player.

Club career
Mi Tianhe started his football career in 1997, playing for the various Changchun Yatai youth teams. Eventually graduating from the youth and reserve teams he would break into the first team squad during the 2003 league season. While he saw Changchun win  promoted to the top tier at the end of the 2005 league season the club would decide to bring in Zong Lei at the beginning of the 2006 league season. Mi Tianhe would predominantly sit on the bench while Changchun grew from strength to strength and even go on to win the 2007 Chinese Super League title. Playing as a second choice goalkeeper for several seasons Mi Tianhe finally experience regular first team selection when Zong Lei was injured during much of the 2008 league season where he was given a run of seven games. However, despite his talents as a goalkeeper his performances were unable to establish him as a first choice goalkeeper for Changchun and Zong Lei would regain his position within the team. He was released by Changchun at the end of 2014 season.

In March 2016, Mi was loaned to China League Two side Baoding Yingli Yitong until 31 December 2016. He made a permanent transfer to Baoding Yingli Yitong in February 2017.

Honours
Chinese Super League: 2007
Chinese Jia B League: 2003

References

External links
Player profile at sports.sina.com.cn
Player profile at csldata.sports.sohu.com
Player profile at sodasoccer.com

1983 births
Living people
Footballers from Changchun
Association football goalkeepers
Chinese footballers
Changchun Yatai F.C. players
Baoding Yingli Yitong players
Chinese Super League players
China League One players